Leea tinctoria is a species of plant in the family Vitaceae. It is endemic to São Tomé Island.  It is an important nectar source for the bird Nectarinia newtonii (Newton's yellow-breasted sunbird). It has orange flowers.

References

Flora of São Tomé Island
tinctoria
Near threatened plants
Endemic flora of São Tomé and Príncipe
Taxonomy articles created by Polbot